Yoon Sun-woo (born Yoon Min-soo; 7 September 1985) is a South Korean actor. He is best known for his roles in the television series Moon Lovers: Scarlet Heart Ryeo (2016), Still 17 (2018), Home for Summer (2019) and Hot Stove League (2019–2020).

Filmography

Film

Television series

Awards and nominations

Notes

References

External links 
 
 

1985 births
Living people
South Korean male television actors
South Korean male film actors